Minnesota State Highway 107 (MN 107) is a  highway in east-central Minnesota, which runs from its intersection with State Highway 65 in Stanchfield Township near Braham and continues north to its northern terminus at its intersection with State Highway 23 in Pine County near Brook Park.

Highway 107 passes through the communities of Braham, Grasston, and Henriette.

Route description
Highway 107 serves as a north–south route between Braham, Grasston, Henriette, and Brook Park. It is geographically located between the cities of Cambridge and Hinckley in east-central Minnesota and parallels Interstate 35 and State Highway 65 throughout its route.

The route intersects State Highway 70 twice.  Highway 107 and Highway 70 are concurrent for two miles between Braham and Grasston.

Highway 107 is also known as Main Avenue in Braham.

The original part of the route is legally defined as Route 134 in the Minnesota Statutes. The southern portion is part of Minnesota Constitutional Route 5. It is not marked with either of these numbers.

History
Highway 107 was authorized in 1933 between Grasston and Brook Park.

Present day Highway 107 was originally numbered Highway 65 between Braham and Grasston from 1934 to 1942.  Nearby Highway 65 was built on a new alignment  and this old section of 65 between Braham and Grasston was renumbered 107 as a southerly extension of the existing Highway 107.

All of Highway 107 was paved by 1960.

Major intersections

References

107
Transportation in Isanti County, Minnesota
Transportation in Kanabec County, Minnesota
Transportation in Pine County, Minnesota